Robert Brian Ftorek (born January 2, 1952) is an American professional ice hockey coach and former player. He was enshrined as member of the United States Hockey Hall of Fame in 1991.

Playing career
Ftorek played in the 1962, 1963 and 1964 Quebec International Pee-Wee Hockey Tournaments with his Boston youth team. He later played on the 1972 United States Olympic Hockey team that surprisingly won the silver medal at the 1972 Winter Olympics. He also played for Team USA at the 1972 "Pool B" Ice Hockey World Championship where he was selected to the tournament all-star team. Originally drafted by the New England Whalers of the World Hockey Association (WHA) in 1972, Ftorek instead signed with the Detroit Red Wings of the National Hockey League (NHL). However, the Red Wings regarded him as too small to make it as a professional and he only appeared in a handful of NHL games. Having spent most of his time in the minors with the Virginia Wings of the American Hockey League (AHL), Ftorek decided to move over to the WHA in 1974, and at this time the Whalers traded his WHA rights to the Phoenix Roadrunners.

Ftorek quickly became the Roadrunners' biggest star and he made history in 1977 when he won the Gordie Howe Trophy as the league's most valuable player, becoming the first American professional ice hockey player to be named a league MVP. Ftorek confirmed his status as the most accomplished American player of the 1970s in the inaugural 1976 Canada Cup, where he was elected MVP of Team USA and also was the team's leading scorer. After playing parts of three seasons in Phoenix, when the Roadrunners franchise folded Ftorek signed with the Cincinnati Stingers.

After the WHA folded following the 1978–79 season, he signed with the Quebec Nordiques of the NHL and served as the team's captain in 1981. Ftorek played for Team USA at the 1981 Canada Cup tournament. He was traded to the New York Rangers during the 1981–82 NHL season, where he played through the 1984–85 NHL season and finished his NHL career. Ftorek was a member of the Tulsa Oilers (CHL) team that suspended operations on February 16, 1984, playing only road games for the final six weeks of 1983–84 season. Despite this adversity, the team went on to win the league's championship. He played in parts of two seasons with the New Haven Nighthawks of the AHL before retiring from professional play.

Ftorek completed his NHL career with 77 goals, 150 assists, 227 points, and 262 penalty minutes in 334 games. In his WHA career, Ftorek tallied 216 goals, 307 assists, 523 points, and 365 penalty minutes in 373 games, making him sixth on the WHA's all-time points list, and ninth in both the WHA's all-time career goal and assist leaders. His other WHA accomplishments include participating in the 1976, 1977, 1978, and 1979 WHA All-Star games as well as making the All-WHA First team in 1977, 1979, and the All-WHA Second team in 1976 and 1978.

Coaching career
Ftorek began his professional coaching career with the AHL's New Haven Nighthawks in 1985. He remained with then until the 1987–88 season when he moved up to the NHL as the Los Angeles Kings' head coach until 1989. Following this, he was an assistant coach for the Quebec Nordiques and New Jersey Devils in the NHL. In 1992, he was named head coach of the AHL's Utica Devils - New Jersey's top farm team - and remained as head coach when the team became the Albany River Rats. In 1995, the same year the New Jersey Devils won the Stanley Cup, Ftorek led the River Rats to the Calder Cup in the AHL. In 1996, Ftorek began his second stint as a New Jersey Devils assistant coach, then took the head coach's position in 1998. On January 29, 2000, the Devils played a memorable game against Detroit. In the second period, the Devils' Jay Pandolfo was involved in a collision with Detroit's Mathieu Dandenault that left Pandolfo's face bloody after a collision with the boards in the Red Wings zone. The officials allowed play to continue, only for Kirk Maltby to skate down to the other end of the rink and score a goal that gave Detroit a 3–1 lead. So irate was Ftorek over play not being stopped because of Pandolfo's injury, that Ftorek hurled the Devils' wooden bench onto the ice, resulting in Ftorek's ejection from the game, and subsequent one-game suspension.

In 2000, Ftorek led the Devils back into the playoffs but was fired by Lou Lamoriello with nine games remaining in the regular season amidst complaints from the players. Dissent sources included Ken Daneyko, whom Ftorek benched two games short of 1,000 games played, making him miss out on the achievement at home. Assistant coach Larry Robinson replaced Ftorek and the Devils went on to win their second Stanley Cup. He remained with the team as a scout, and had his name engraved on the Stanley Cup for the second time in that year.

Ftorek joined the Boston Bruins as head coach in 2001. However, after two years of poor efforts by his teams, Ftorek was fired late in the 2002–03 season with only nine games remaining in the season. Bruins general manager Mike O'Connell took over as coach for the rest of the season. In 2003, Ftorek rejoined the Devils as head coach of their AHL affiliate in Albany. When the Devils affiliation was moved to the Lowell Devils, Ftorek was retained as head coach of the team.

Ftorek holds the dubious distinction of being the only coach to be fired by two different teams in the final days of what was a winning regular season for that team – New Jersey in 1999–2000 and  Boston in 2002–03. His record was 41–20–8–5 with the Devils and 33–28–8–4 with the Bruins.

In October 2007, Ftorek was hired as the head coach of the Erie Otters of the Ontario Hockey League (OHL), replacing Peter Sidorkiewicz. Ftorek led the Otters to a 15–34–4 record over their final 53 games as the team missed the playoffs for their third consecutive season. In 2008–09, the Otters returned to the post-season as they improved to a 34–29–5 record, earning 73 points. Erie was then eliminated by the London Knights in the first round of the playoffs. The Otters made their second straight playoff appearance in 2009–10, as they had a record of 33–28–7, earning 73 points once again. Erie was eliminated in the first round once again, as the Windsor Spitfires swept the Otters in four games. The Otters improved their point total further in 2010–11, winning 40 games, and earned 82 points and a third-straight post-season appearance. Erie took the two-time Memorial Cup champions Spitfires to seven games before being eliminated. The 2011–12 campaign for Ftorek and the Erie Otters was incredibly dismal, as the Otters dealt with a rebuilding roster after losing many large stars of the previous years, ending the season with the OHL's third-worst season by a single team in its history at 10-52-6. On November 29, 2012, the Otters announced that they had relieved Ftorek of his head coaching duties.

On August 7, 2013, the Calgary Flames hired Ftorek as an assistant coach for their AHL affiliate, the Abbotsford Heat.

On November 29, 2016, Ftorek was named head coach of the ECHL's Norfolk Admirals replacing Rod Aldoff. He was released by the Admirals following an ownership change in 2019.

Awards and accomplishments
1972 Ice Hockey World Championships Pool B all star team
Most Valuable Player (Team USA ) (1976 Canada Cup)
Won Gary Davidson Trophy (WHA Most Valuable Player) (1977)
All-WHA First team  (1977, 1979)
All-WHA Second team  (1976, 1978)
Played in 1976, 1977, 1978 and 1979 WHA All-Star game

A member of the United States Hockey Hall of Fame since 1991, Ftorek was part of the initial group of players elected to the World Hockey Association Hall of Fame in 2010. He was elected to the AHL Hall of Fame in 2020.

Career statistics

Regular season and playoffs

International

NHL coaching records

Minor league and junior coaching career

Personal life
Ftorek and his wife Wendy have four children. His youngest daughter Anna Ftorek died suddenly of a heart attack at the family's home in Wolfeboro, New Hampshire in 2012 at the age of 23. His son, Sam, played professional hockey for 17 years, and has since followed in his footsteps as coach and was named the first coach of the Southern Professional Hockey League's expansion team, the Roanoke Rail Yard Dawgs, on April 29, 2016.

See also
List of NHL head coaches

References

External links
 

1952 births
Albany River Rats coaches
American ice hockey coaches
American men's ice hockey forwards
American people of Slovak descent
Boston Bruins coaches
Cincinnati Stingers players
Detroit Red Wings players
Erie Otters coaches
Ice hockey coaches from Massachusetts
Ice hockey players at the 1972 Winter Olympics
Living people
Los Angeles Kings coaches
Medalists at the 1972 Winter Olympics
New Haven Nighthawks players
New Jersey Devils coaches
New York Rangers players
Olympic silver medalists for the United States in ice hockey
Sportspeople from Needham, Massachusetts
Phoenix Roadrunners (WHA) players
Quebec Nordiques coaches
Quebec Nordiques players
Stanley Cup champions
Tulsa Oilers (1964–1984) players
Undrafted National Hockey League players
United States Hockey Hall of Fame inductees
Virginia Wings players
Ice hockey players from Massachusetts